DreiLänderBahn (literally: Three States Railway) is the name under which HLB Hessenbahn, a subsidiary of the Hessian state railway company, Hessische Landesbahn, operates a group of regional rail services in the German states of Hesse, North Rhine-Westphalia and Rhineland-Palatinate.

Services 

DreiLänderBahn operates the following services:

Stock 

The DreiLänderBahn predominantly operates on non-electrified branch lines. As a result, it uses modern diesel multiple units exclusively. Its vehicle fleet includes Alstom LHB Coradia LINT units of DB Classes 640 (LINT 27) and 648 (LINT 41), which offer comfortable seats with armrests and tables in the 1st class accommodation, a video surveillance system and two multi-purpose compartments (e.g. for bicycles or prams). Large windows provide make the interior very light. By contrast, legroom is less than in the older, more traditional Silberling coaches. The DreiLänderBahn also offers a taxi service for connexion to the station. The DreiLänderBahn's multiples are filled at Finnentrop, Dillenburg and Siegen, where they are also cleaned externally.

References

External links
 Official Web site 

Railway lines in Hesse
Railway lines in Rhineland-Palatinate
Railway lines in North Rhine-Westphalia